The 2006–07 Superliga Espanola de Hockey Hielo season was the 33rd season of the Superliga Espanola de Hockey Hielo, the top level of ice hockey in Spain. Six teams participated in the league, and CG Puigcerda won the championship.

Standings

Playoffs

Pre-Playoffs 
 Majadahonda HC – CH Txuri Urdin 0:2 (1:5, 2:7)
 FC Barcelona – CH Val d’Aran Vielha 2:1 (5:3, 5:6 OT, 7:6)

Semifinals 
 CG Puigcerdà – FC Barcelona 2:0 (4:2, 4:2)
 CH Jaca – CH Txuri Urdin 2:0 (4:3 OT, 6:4)

Final 
 CG Puigcerdà – CH Jaca 2:0 (5:4 OT, 11:3)

External links
Season on hockeyarchives.info

Liga Nacional de Hockey Hielo seasons
Spa
Liga